Marquette Smith (born July 14, 1972) is a former American football running back. Mostly known for his prep and college career, he spent two seasons with the Carolina Panthers of the National Football League (NFL), but knee injuries in successive years during the pre-season kept him off the field.

Biography
Smith was an All-American running back at Lake Howell High School in Winter Park, Florida. In 1990, he was named High School Football Player of the Year by Gatorade, and Offensive Player of the Year by USA Today. Considered to be the premier recruit in the class of 1991, Smith chose Florida State over Penn State and Florida. He could not live up to expectations, and decided to transfer to UCF after his redshirt sophomore season in 1994.

In only two seasons at UCF, Smith rushed for 2,569 yards; through the 2018 season, he is fourth on UCF's list of career rushing yardage leaders, and the only player in the top ten with less than a three-season career at UCF. He is the only player in UCF history to rush for more than 1,000 yards in back-to-back seasons, and his 1,511 yards (with 14 touchdowns) in 1995 set the school's single-season record (later surpassed by Kevin Smith in 2007). Smith earned second team All-America honors in 1995, and was an honorable mention selection on UCF's 25th Anniversary Football Team as compiled by the Orlando Sentinel.

After his time with the NFL's Panthers, Smith played for the Shreveport Knights of the short-lived Regional Football League in 1999.

See also
 UCF Knights football statistical leaders

References

External links
UCF Knights bio

1972 births
Living people
People from Casselberry, Florida
Players of American football from Florida
Sportspeople from Seminole County, Florida
American football running backs
Florida State Seminoles football players
UCF Knights football players
Regional Football League players